Mihai Mălaimare Jr. (born 1975) is a Romanian cinematographer. Born in Bucharest, he is the son of the Romanian actor and former politician . He studied at the Caragiale National University of Theatre and Film in Bucharest. 

He has been the cinematographer on films directed by Francis Ford Coppola, Paul Thomas Anderson, and Taika Waititi, among others. Mălaimare Jr. was nominated for Best Cinematography at the 24th Independent Spirit Awards in 2008, for Youth Without Youth.

Filmography

References

External links 

1975 births
Living people
Romanian cinematographers
Artists from Bucharest
Caragiale National University of Theatre and Film alumni